Till Sebastian Schumacher (born 10 December 1997) is a German professional footballer who plays as a defender for Austrian Bundesliga side Austria Klagenfurt.

Career statistics

Club

Notes

References

1997 births
Living people
German footballers
Germany youth international footballers
German expatriate footballers
Association football midfielders
Regionalliga players
Czech First League players
Czech National Football League players
Austrian Football Bundesliga players
Rot-Weiss Essen players
Borussia Dortmund players
Borussia Dortmund II players
FC Vysočina Jihlava players
Bohemians 1905 players
SK Austria Klagenfurt players
German expatriate sportspeople in the Czech Republic
Expatriate footballers in the Czech Republic
Footballers from Essen